Albert William James (22 September 1914 – 30 September 2006) was an Australian politician. He was born in Collie, Western Australia, the son of Rowley James, a future Labor member for Hunter in the Australian House of Representatives. Albert was educated at state schools in Kurri Kurri, New South Wales. He was a policeman from 1940 to 1960, when he contested the by-election for his father's old seat of Hunter that followed H. V. Evatt's resignation. He held Hunter until his retirement in 1980. James died in 2006.

Links with the KGB
In 2014 newly released Russian intelligence archives revealed that James had been in regular contact with the Soviet embassy in Canberra in the early 1970s, although it was unclear what information he had passed on.
ASIO files have confirmed the KGB connection.

References

Australian Labor Party members of the Parliament of Australia
Members of the Australian House of Representatives for Hunter
Members of the Australian House of Representatives
1914 births
2006 deaths
People from Collie, Western Australia
20th-century Australian politicians